Leave No Traces is a 2021 Polish drama film directed by Jan P. Matuszyński. It was selected to compete for the Golden Lion at the 78th Venice International Film Festival. It was selected as the Polish entry for the Best International Feature Film at the 94th Academy Awards. The film is based on the book Żeby nie było śladów by Cezary Łazarewicz, which received the Nike Award in 2017.

Plot
Jurek, the only witness to the state-sanctioned murder of high school student Grzegorz Przemyk, is targeted by the government during the 1980s era of martial law in Poland.

Cast
Mateusz Górski as Grzegorz Przemyk
Agnieszka Grochowska as Grażyna Popiel (Jurek's mother)
Tomasz Ziętek as Jurek Popiel
Tomasz Kot as Kowalczyk
Robert Wieckiewicz as General Czesław Kiszczak
Jacek Braciak as Tadeusz Popiel (Jurek's father)
Aleksandra Konieczna as Wiesława Bardon
Sandra Korzeniak as Barbara Sadowska

Reception
Review aggregator Rotten Tomatoes gives the film 58% approval rating based on 12 reviews, with an average rating of 6.20 out of 10.

Wendy Ide of The Observer called Leave No Traces "[a] meticulously detailed thriller", while Cath Clarke of The Guardian said that "In the end, this film is never uninteresting but fails to gather enough pace or power for the slog of the marathon".

Paul Whitington of the Irish Independent had criticized film's length but praised it for being a "conspiracy drama", adding that "[it's] a lesson from history that remains depressingly relevant".

Kevin Maher of The Times said that "[the film is a] deep dive into student's murder is self-important".

According to Guy Lodge of Variety, the film is "[a] moving but somewhat congested", while Keith Uhlich of The Hollywood Reporter described Leave No Traces as "Too torturous by half".

While attending film's Venice screening, Deadline Hollywoods Valerie Complex wrote that "Leave No Traces often feels formless and unremarkable".

See also
List of submissions to the 94th Academy Awards for Best International Feature Film
List of Polish submissions for the Academy Award for Best International Feature Film

References

External links

2021 drama films
Polish drama films
2020s Polish-language films